The West Asia Super League (WASL) is an international basketball league organised by FIBA Asia, consisting of clubs from Western Asia and Gulf regions, in addition to the representatives of India and Kazakhstan. The league was announced in 2022 and started with the inaugural season from December. 

The league tentatively exist out of 18 teams, divided in two sub-zones. The champions and runners-up of each season qualify for the FIBA Asia Champions Cup.

History
On March 31, 2022 FIBA announced the creation of the West Asia Super League. The United Arab Emirates-based company eVulpa was appointed as partner for its commercial rights.

The inaugural season has begun on December 19, 2022, and ends in May 2023, with a total of 18 teams.

Records
Largest win
 +55 by Al Hilal vs. Al Bashaer (103–48) on 6 March 2023

Youngest player to appear in a WASL game
 17 years-old Hussain Albalooshi (Shabab Al Ahli Basketball) on 6 March 2023 (vs. Al Bashaer)

References

WASL
Sports leagues established in 2022